The Indian Ridge Hospital Open Invitational was an official PGA Tour tournament that played for one year at the Indian Ridge Country Club in Andover, Massachusetts. It was played opposite the 1969 PGA Championship. The tournament was held in August 1969 and organized by Indian Ridge head club pro Ross Coon. It benefited the Children's Hospital of Boston.

The tournament was won by 27-year-old Monty Kaser of Wichita, Kansas by one stroke over Steve Oppermann.

Winners

References

1969 in golf
Andover, Massachusetts
August 1969 sports events in the United States
Former PGA Tour events
Golf in Massachusetts
Events in Essex County, Massachusetts
Sports competitions in Massachusetts
Sports in Essex County, Massachusetts
Tourist attractions in Essex County, Massachusetts